The following is a list of main, recurring, and minor characters in the Disney Channel Original Series, Sonny with a Chance and its spin-off So Random!.

Main

Sonny Munroe 
Allison "Sonny" Munroe (Demi Lovato). The newest member of comedy sketch TV show So Random!, She is from Appleton, Wisconsin. "Sonny" is Allison's nickname. Sonny used to dislike her nickname when she was little, but now she thinks it suits her.

Sonny is usually goofy and a bit childish, often admitting to do things that may seem strange to others. Friendly, sweet, and caring towards those around her, she is known as the nice girl of the group and does her best to help other people with their problems and achieve her dreams, but earns mixed results often due to some situations involving her meddling problems. She is shown to be talented at singing as well as playing the piano and guitar.

Sonny develops an on-and-off rivalry with Chad Dylan Cooper, and they become a couple in season 2 after Chad asks her out. She later breaks up with him due to his selfishness. In the series finale, it is hinted that Sonny still has feelings for him, though the fate of their relationship is left uncertain. Sonny is absent from the spinoff series So Random! due to Demi Lovato leaving the cast for health reasons; Sonny's absence is never explained.

Tawni Hart 
Tawni Hart (Tiffany Thornton). Tawni is obsessed with fashion, pink, and herself. She becomes upset if she does not get her way. In the beginning, Tawni was openly jealous of Sonny to the point that she committed mail fraud by stealing all of Sonny's fan mail, but later grew more accepting of her as a member of the show.

Tawni is probably the only person who initially knew about Sonny and Chad's mutual feelings for each other, but never mentioned it to anybody. Tawni has a secret - she likes Sonny. She is jealous of Sonny's fans. Despite their rocky beginnings, she has since begun to care about Sonny as a friend and eventually as a best friend.

She is often seen giving her advice and is shown to be nicer than before, such as the instance of driving Sonny all the way back to Wisconsin in "Sonny with a Secret", but she tells Sonny to do projects for her, shown in "Falling for the Falls (Part 1)". Also, she still doesn't like it that Sonny's boyfriend is Chad, as do all of the So Random! cast. She has been on So Random! for five years. She says that she was homeschooled, and that her mother Tammy (also her manager) was very strict.

Chad Dylan Cooper 
Chad Dylan Cooper (Sterling Knight). He is the teen heart-throb of Tween Weekly and Mackenzie Falls. He is the arch-rival of Sonny and the cast of So Random! early in the series, as well as Sonny's love/hate interest as developed later. He seems to have liked Sonny since the beginning of the show, and in one episode tries to force her to kiss him, before they were dating.

He is a bratty egomaniac and thinks that he the "greatest actor of his generation", and can be seen as effeminate in his obsession with his own appearance. Despite this selfish and childish behavior, he has moments where he shows he is kind and deep, especially when he's around Sonny. He became more friendly towards the cast of So Random! because of his feelings towards Sonny, and later, he eventually falls in love with her and starts dating her. However, in "My Two Chads", it is revealed that Chad has a stunt double named Chaz, who he has to go on dates with Sonny that he deems dangerous. When Sonny finds out about this, she dumps him, but they get back together at the end.

In "Sonny with a Choice", when he discovers that So Random! won the Tween Choice Awards, his ego and jealousy get the better of him, leading him to recount the votes so that Mackenzie Falls wins instead, which he later tells Sonny. Sonny is disgusted at his inability to put others before himself, causing them to break up for good. In "New Girl", it is revealed that he still has feelings for Sonny. Sonny writes a song about him and hums it at the end, hinting that she still has feelings for him as well. He later joins So Random! when Sonny leaves the show.

Nico Harris 
Nico Harris (Brandon Mychal Smith). One of the primary cast members of So Random!, Nico is Grady's best friend and they always do pranks and wacky things together. He and Grady attempt many pranks but they often fail because (in Tawni's words) they are "full of loud music, bad choreography and things being thrown" as they often copy the movies. The two are shown to be a little immature. He always comes up with ideas that later turn crazy.

Nico seems to think he's quite the womanizer, he hardly ever succeeds in getting dates. He also has a crush on Mackenzie Falls star Penelope, but she constantly turns him down, and not very nicely. He and Grady manage to make a body-spray that attracts girls but in the wrong way. He was on a one-man show called NICO.

His dad is a lawyer. He also shares a birthday with Grady. At the very beginning of Sonny with a Chance, he had a slight crush on Sonny but he grows to only like her as a friend. Whenever he has a project, he tries to find a way to get Sonny to do it for him.

Nico is absent for 2 episodes: "Sonny: So Far" (but appeared in the flashbacks) and "Sonny with a Grant".

Grady Mitchell 
Grady Mitchell (Doug Brochu). A cast member of So Random!, Grady is best friends with Nico. They can be shown to be a little immature. He is also wacky and full of silliness and is always eager to eat. Together, he and Nico hatch plans such as making money by selling Tawni's trash on the Internet or getting girls by creating an extremely attractive cologne. He has also been shown to believe in the existence of fictional worlds such as Narnia and Pandora.

On the Disney Channel site, it says that he is from Orlando, Florida. His father was in the military, and he has a brother, Grant, who constantly teases him for having no girlfriend. He also shares a birthday with Nico. Grady is shown to try to find a way to get Sonny to do his project homework, like Nico and Tawni. In the last episode of the series, he manages to impress Sonny's new friend, Mel. The finale ends with Mel admitting to herself she loves him.

Grady is absent for 1 episode "Sonny: So Far" (but appeared in the flashbacks). He was present for all episodes in season 2.

Zora Lancaster 
Zora Lancaster (Allisyn Ashley Arm). The youngest cast member of So Random!. She was 11 in season 1 and 12 in season 2. Zora has a genius IQ of 155 and is the smartest member of the group. She is known to be "the weird one" because Zora has a weird personality and always seems to be up to something suspicious and weird. Sometimes, she is shown to be a little dangerous as seen in the title sequence to be driving a monster machine. She is also a prankster. She hates Dakota Condor and insists that she's "Evil". She also is comfortable in small spaces.

Zora, Tawni, and Sonny all share one room but Zora prefers to hide up in the air vent and the sarcophagus in the prop house, eavesdropping on private conversations. She tends to wear extremely bright, unique clothes. She has a short temper and when provoked will often try to physically attack the other person to express her anger at the other person. In season two, she is shown to become more mature and a little less weird.

Zora is absent for 20 episodes, and she appeared in 26 of 46 episodes.

Recurring 
 Marshall Pike (Michael Kostroff) is the executive producer of So Random! and Mackenzie Falls. He also seems to be optimistic most of the time but not when it comes to talking about his bald patch. He lives with his mother.

(First appearance: "Sketchy Beginnings", Last appearance: "Marshall with a Chance")

 Connie Munroe (Nancy McKeon) is Sonny's mother. She is a bit strange, but gives good advice and cares a lot for Sonny, always wanting the best for her and is very supportive. She is happy that Sonny is on the show, but wants her to keep her priorities in order and keep her school work satisfactory as mentioned in Cheater Girls. She lives with Sonny in their apartment and apparently does needlepoint and is addicted to Mackenzie Falls. She only appeared in 7 episodes.

(First appearance: "Sketchy Beginnings", Last appearance: "Falling for the Falls Part 2")

 Mr. Condor (Daniel Roebuck) is the head of "Condor Studios". He cancels the show of any actor who ticks him off. He also doesn't know that his own daughter, Dakota Condor, is evil and has a crush on Chad.

(First appearance: "Sonny and the Studio Brat", Last appearance: "Sonny with a Grant")

 Dakota Condor (G. Hannelius) is the daughter of the founder of Condor Studios, Mr. Condor, A sassy, selfish and bratty girl who is obsessed with and has a crush on Chad Dylan Cooper. She is rivals with Zora (who always calls her "evil"). She loves bullying Zora. Her father thinks she is an "angel", but often disobeys him behind his back, such as crushing on the star of a show she's certainly not allowed to watch. Dakota appears more often in season 2 than she appears in season 1.

(First appearance: "Sonny and the Studio Brat", Last appearance: "Dakota's Revenge")

 Joy Bitterman (Vicki Lewis) is the on set teacher for the cast of So Random!. She claims she has not laughed since she left the United States Navy, which may explain why she is so tense and bitter. She lives alone with her 16 cats.

(First appearance: "Cheater Girls", Last appearance: "The Problem with Pauly")

 Murphy (Steve Hytner) is the offbeat security guard who works by the So Random! sets door. He takes his job a little too seriously and enjoys taking Nico and Grady's pizzas, biting into each slice and putting them back in the box. It is unknown why he hates Nico and Grady so much.

(First appearance: "Three's Not Company", Last appearance: "Dakota's Revenge")

Trevor (Devaughn Nixon) - Trevor in Mackenzie Falls.

(First appearance: "Walk a Mile in My Pants", Last appearance: "Sonny with a Choice")

Chloe (Ashley Jackson) - Chloe in Mackenzie Falls she replaces Portlyn for season 2.

(First appearance: "Walk a Mile in My Pants", Last appearance: "Sonny with a Choice")

Penelope (Leslie-Anne Huff) - Penelope in Mackenzie Falls. Penelope has a larger role in "Sonny with a Secret" where she frames Sonny for crimes she didn't commit so that she can date Chad Dylan Cooper. She became so insane that she left Chad to die with the So Random Cast (Minus Tawni) on his airplane after she hijacked it and nearly killed Sonny with a bomb. She gets arrested at the end when Tawni removed her Vicki Sickowitz disguise and revealed her crimes.

(First appearance: "The Legend of Candy Face", Last appearance: "Sonny with a Secret")

Devin (William Georges) - Devon in Mackenzie Falls. It is known that he possesses an "Electronic Man Scaper".

(First appearance: "The Legend of Candy Face", Last appearance: "The Legend of Candy Face")

 Portlyn Maddison (Jillian Murray) is a cast member of Mackenzie Falls. She is the rich mean girl of Mackenzie Falls and her character has the same first name as her own in the drama. Portlyn is also shown to be a quite dumb at times. She always wears the Mackenzie Falls cast uniform.

(First appearance: "West Coast Story", Last appearance: "Tales from the Prop House")

Bart (Andrew Parker) is Chad's personal assistant. (First appearance: "Sonny with a Chance of Dating")
Gassie the Toot'n Pooch (Gassie) is the titular character in the sketch. He is a Rough Collie. (First appearance: "Battle of the Networks' Stars")
 Howie (Lanny Horn) is the cafeteria's sandwich guy who gives out sandwich orders. He is shown to be a fan of Chad Dylan Cooper. (First appearance: "Sonny in the Kitchen with Dinner")
 Grant Mitchell (Preston Jones) is Grady's big-headed and bullying brother who constantly teases Grady about his life, career and his ill fortune with women. Grant is the president of his fraternity, ΔΝ (Delta Nu) and says the name of his fraternity when leaving the current scene. He is also portrayed as violent, with Grady constantly preparing for beatings throughout his visit. He is portrayed as a womanizer but later admits that he has no good friends like Grady and that despite how he acts he believes that he should be more like Grady, they become friends at the end of the episode. He gets a job at Condor Studios and replaces Chad as Mackenzie on Mackenzie Falls. (First appearance: "Grady with a Chance of Sonny"), (Last appearance: "Sonny with a Grant")
 Mel Winters (Skyler Day) is a waitress at The Patio, a cool coffee shop, and Sonny's neighbour.

References

Characters
Lists of Disney television series characters
Lists of American sitcom television characters
Lists of children's television characters